Mansfield is a village in East Ayrshire in Scotland.

It is north of New Cumnock from which it is separated by the River Nith and the adjacent village of Pathhead.

External links 

Villages in East Ayrshire
New Cumnock